Joseph John Sepkoski Jr. (July 26, 1948 – May 1, 1999) was a University of Chicago paleontologist.  Sepkoski studied the fossil record and the diversity of life on Earth.  Sepkoski and David Raup contributed to the knowledge of extinction events.  They suggested that the extinction of dinosaurs 66 mya was part of a cycle of mass extinctions that may have occurred every 26 million years.

Life and work

Sepkoski was born in Presque Isle, Maine. In 1970, Sepkoski received a B.S. degree, magna cum laude, from the University of Notre Dame. Under Stephen Jay Gould he earned a Ph.D. in geological sciences from Harvard University in 1977. His Ph.D. was on the field geology and paleontology of the Black Hills of South Dakota.  From 1974 to 1978, Sepkoski taught at the University of Rochester. In 1978 he joined the University of Chicago and became a professor in 1986.  Sepkoski was also a research associate at the Field Museum of Natural History in Chicago.  He died of heart failure related to high blood pressure at the age of 50.

Sepkoski is perhaps best known for his global compendia of marine animal families and genera, data sets that continue to motivate a tremendous amount of paleobiological research.  Sepkoski himself explored his compendium very thoroughly.  In 1981, he identified three great Evolutionary Faunas in the marine animal fossil record.  Each of his Evolutionary Faunas, the Cambrian, Paleozoic, and Modern Faunas, is composed of Linnean classes of animals that have covarying diversity patterns, characteristic rates of turnover, and broadly similar ecologies.  Most importantly, they sequentially replaced one another as dominant groups during the Phanerozoic.  Sepkoski modeled the Evolutionary Faunas using three coupled logistic functions, but the underlying drivers of the prominent shift in taxonomic composition represented by the three faunas remains unknown.

Sepkoski was married to paleontologist Christine Janis, a specialist in fossil mammals.  His son (from a previous marriage) is the historian of science David Sepkoski.

Awards
 (1983).  Charles Schuchert Award,  Paleontological Society
 Elected foreign member of the Polish Academy of Sciences

Selected publications

Further reading
 Subscription needed.

External links
 Miller, Arnold.  (Sep. 1999).  Memorial: J. John Sepkoski, Jr.: A personal reflection .  Journal of Paleontology.
NASA, Near Earth Object Program
Sepkoski's Online Genus Database

1948 births
1999 deaths
American paleontologists
University of Notre Dame alumni
Harvard University alumni
University of Rochester faculty
University of Chicago faculty
People from Presque Isle, Maine